The men's discus throw event at the 1994 Commonwealth Games was held on 26 August at the Centennial Stadium in Victoria, British Columbia.

Results

References

Discus
1994